Zapotal District is a district and village in the canton of Nandayure, Guanacaste Province in Costa Rica.

Located on the Nicoya Peninsula, the district has a population of around 1,250 people.

Villages
Administrative center of the district is the village of Zapotal.

Other villages in the district are Altos de Mora, Cabeceras de Río Ora, Camaronal, Carmen, Cuesta Bijagua, Leona, Manzanales, Río Blanco Este, Río de Oro, Río Ora, San Martín, San Pedro and Soledad.

References

Populated places in Guanacaste Province
Districts of Costa Rica